Rope and Summit is an EP by Swedish band Junip. It was released freely online ahead of the release of the band's first full-length album, five years after their previous EP went on sale.

Track listing
 "Rope and Summit" – 5:26
 "Far Away" – 2:44
 "At the Doors" – 8:18
 "Loops" – 5:06

Personnel
Elias Araya – drums
José González – vocals, guitar
Tobias Winterkorn – organ, Moog synthesizer

References

2005 EPs
Junip albums